Mike Starkie is a British Conservative politician who is the directly elected mayor of Copeland, for the Borough of Copeland in Cumbria. 

He stood as an Independent, winning the 2015 election after coming first due to him beating the Labour candidate after transfer votes (the Conservatives were eliminated after coming last in the first round of votes). In June 2020, dropping his 'Independent' stance, announcing he'd joined the Conservative Party (UK).

He is supportive of elected mayors, and has called for a referendum on having an elected mayor for the whole county of Cumbria. Starkie is the first Mayor of Copeland, and his position was established (after a referendum) to replace the role of a Council leader and Cabinet.

Mr Starkie also played a strong role in the Whitehaven coal mine project, cited by many as a national embarrassment in the run up to the 2021 UK hosted climate summit.

Election results

References

Year of birth missing (living people)
Living people
Mayors of places in Cumbria